Below are the rosters for teams competing in the 2021 World Junior Ice Hockey Championships. Player NHL rights are accurate as of the tournament.

Group A

Head coach:  André Tourigny

Source: IIHF.com

Head coach:  Antti Pennanen

Source: IIHF.com

Head coach:  Tobias Abstreiter

Source: IIHF.com

Head coach:  Róbert Petrovický

Source: IIHF.com

Head coach:  Marco Bayer

Source: IIHF.com

Group B

Head coach:  Roger Bader

Source: IIHF.com

Head coach:  Karel Mlejnek

Source: IIHF.com

Head coach:  Igor Larionov

Source: IIHF.com

Head coach:  Joel Rönnmark

Source: IIHF.com

Head coach:  Nate Leaman

Source: IIHF.com

References

External links
WM20 - International Ice Hockey Federation
Roster Information & History - Elite Prospects

Rosters
World Junior Ice Hockey Championships rosters